The Wajak crania (also Wadjak, following the Dutch spelling of the toponym) are two fossil human skulls discovered near Wajak, a village in Tulungagung Regency, East Java, Indonesia (then Dutch East Indies) in 1888/90. The first was found on 24 October 1888 by mining engineer B.D. van Rietschoten who sent it to paleontologist Eugène Dubois who subsequently found the second skull in September 1890. When returning to the Netherlands in 1895, Dubois took the skulls with him. They are now located in Naturalis, Leyden.

Dubbed Wajak Man, and formerly classified by Dubois as a separate species (Homo wadjakensis), the skulls are now recognized as an early anatomically modern human fossil. They were dated to the early-to-mid Holocene (12,000 to 5,000 years ago) in the 1990s, but a 2013 study revised the date to between 28,000 and 37,000 years ago. Their morphological characteristics have been described as showing affinity to both proto-Australoid (intermediate between Solo Man and contemporary Australo-Melanesians) and to Mongoloid populations, specifically Chinese people, sharing specific Mongoloid traits such as flat face. Some anthropologist argue that a population related to the Wajak crania may be ancestral to both Mongoloid and Australo-Melanesian populations, with the Wajak crania  representing a link between these populations. Anthropologist such as Bulbeck and Turner concluded, based on these and other findings, that "southern Mongoloids" are indigenous to Southeast Asia, with the proto-Mongoloid population to have originated in the Sunda region or Mainland Southeast Asia, while their distant relatives, the Australo-Melanesians originated in the Sahul region with at least 50,000 years of divergence. Anthropologist Paul Storm argues that "the most likely interpretation is to consider the Wajak skulls as Mesolithic robust representatives of the present inhabitants of Java", Javanese people.

See also
Peopling of Southeast Asia
List of human evolution fossils#Holocene

References

Storm,  P., "The  evolutionary  significance  of the Wajak  skulls", Scripta  Geol.  110 (1995)  1-247.
Strom, P., Nelson, A. J., "The many faces of Wadjak Man",  Archaeology in Oceania,
Volume 27, Issue 1 (April 1992), 37-46, doi:10.1002/j.1834-4453.1992.tb00281.x.

External links
"Wadjak man", Merriam-Webster

Upper Paleolithic Homo sapiens fossils
Peopling of Southeast Asia
Archaeology of Indonesia